Link Campus University, formerly Link Campus—University of Malta, is a proprietary, for-profit university located in Rome, Italy, and owned by the for-profit Italian franchise chain CEPU. The university is associated with Italian intelligence agencies.

History and accreditation 
The university was founded in 1999 by former Italian politician Vincenzo Scotti. It opened in Italy as a branch of a Maltese university. It was the first foreign university authorized to operate in Italy. On 4 July 2007, the Minister of Education issued the decree following the Lisbon Convention of 1997 and the laws and acts of the Italian Government which recognize and approve of the degree requirements of the Link Campus. Since 2011, the institution has also been part of the Italian university system, losing its connection with Malta.

See also
 Joseph Mifsud

References

External links
 
 CEPU

Universities in Italy
Schools of the performing arts
Rome Q. XVII Trieste
1999 establishments in Italy
University of Malta